Louis Stokes (February 23, 1925 – August 18, 2015) was an American attorney, civil rights pioneer and politician. He served 15 terms in the United States House of Representatives – representing the east side of Cleveland – and was the first African American congressman elected in the state of Ohio. He was one of the Cold War-era chairmen of the House Intelligence Committee, headed the Congressional Black Caucus, and was the first African American on the House Appropriations Committee.

Early life
Stokes was born in Cleveland, Ohio, the son of Louise (née Stone) and Charles Stokes. He and his brother, politician Carl B. Stokes, lived in one of the first federally funded housing projects, the Outhwaite Homes. Stokes attended Central High School and later served in the U.S. Army from 1943 to 1946. After attending Western Reserve University and the Cleveland State University College of Law on the G.I. Bill, Stokes began practicing law in Cleveland in 1953. He argued the "stop and frisk" case of Terry v. Ohio before the United States Supreme Court in 1968. Later in 1968, he was elected to the House, representing the 21st District of Ohio on Cleveland's East Side. He shifted to the newly created 11th District, covering much of the same area following a 1992 redistricting. Stokes served 30 years in total, retiring in 1999.

Career
Stokes' tenure in the House of Representatives included service on the House Appropriations Committee, where he was influential in bringing revenue to Cleveland. He was particularly interested in veterans' issues and secured funds for health-care facilities for veterans in Cleveland.

In the 1970s, Stokes served as chairman of the House Select Committee on Assassinations, charged with investigating the murders of President John F. Kennedy and civil rights leader Martin Luther King Jr. He served on the House committee that investigated the Iran-Contra Affair. As chairman of the House Ethics Committee, Stokes oversaw the committee's investigation of a corruption scandal known as ABSCAM in 1979–80, which eventually led to convictions of one senator and six House members. Recalling Stokes, U.S. Attorney Steven Dettelbach said: "We were in the midst of a huge ... corruption scandal, and public service was taking a public beating. But Lou Stokes was there as a shining beacon of integrity, of excellence and most important of all for us, of justice."

In 1971, he was a founding member of the Congressional Black Caucus. 

In 1992, Stokes ran for president as an Ohio favorite son, winning the delegates from his home district in Ohio, and then, in a minor Democratic convention drama, refused to release the delegate's votes until the Clinton campaign formally asked for them.

Following his time in Congress, Stokes became a distinguished visiting professor at the Jack, Joseph and Morton Mandel School of Applied Social Sciences at Case Western Reserve University. He actively served in this role until the time of his death.

Personal life
Stokes' daughter, Angela, is a former Cleveland Municipal Court judge who served from 1995 through 2015, while another, Lori, is currently Co-anchor of The 5 O'clock News and The 10 O'clock news and Anchor of The 6 O'clock News and former Co-anchor of Good Day New York WNYW Fox 5. His son, Chuck, is also a journalist with WXYZ-TV in Detroit. Stokes' brother, Carl B. Stokes, was the first African American mayor of a large American city. Stokes was a cousin of funk and R&B musician Rick James.

Stokes was a Prince Hall Freemason, and a member of the Cleveland Alumni chapter of Kappa Alpha Psi fraternity.

Later life and death
Stokes retired in 2012 as senior counsel in the law firm of Squire, Sanders & Dempsey, with offices in Cleveland and Washington.

On July 20, 2015, it was reported that Stokes had both brain cancer and lung cancer. He died on August 18, 2015, at his home in Cleveland from the diseases at the age of 90. He was interred at Lake View Cemetery in Cleveland.

Legacy
The Cuyahoga Metropolitan Housing Authority opened the Louis Stokes Museum on September 13, 2007. This museum houses Stokes memorabilia, video interviews, miscellaneous video footage, awards and a written history about Stokes and his rise to prominence. The museum is located at Outhwaite Homes, 4302 Quincy Avenue.

From 2006 to 2008, the Western Reserve Historical Society opened an exhibition on the lives of Congressman Stokes and his brother titled "Carl and Louis Stokes: From the Projects to Politics". The exhibit uses photographs, manuscript collections, and personal items to showcase Louis Stokes' rise from the Outhwaite homes, his legal career, and his Congressional service. The former Congressman was inducted into the Karamu House Hall of Fame in 2007 for his contributions to the continued legacy of Cleveland's black settlement house and theatre.

Many buildings throughout the country have been named in Stokes honor including: Howard University's medical library, the Cleveland Public Library's main building expansion, and the GCRTA's Windermere station Louis Stokes Station at Windermere. The greater Cleveland area Veteran's hospital was renamed the Louis Stokes Cleveland Department of Veteran Affairs Medical Center. Building 50 on the campus of the National Institutes of Health is named the Louis Stokes Laboratories.

Congressman Stokes' alma mater, Case Western Reserve University, offers the Louis Stokes Congressional Black Caucus Foundation Scholarship worth full tuition to an incoming first-year or transfer undergraduate student. It is intended to help economically and educationally disadvantaged students attain an education at the school.

Autobiography
 Louis Stokes with David Chanoff (2016): The Gentleman from Ohio. (Foreword by Congressman John Lewis). Trillium Books, The Ohio State University Press.

See also

List of African-American United States representatives
List of Cleveland–Marshall College of Law alumni
List of members of the House Un-American Activities Committee

References

External links
 History.house.gov
 Western Reserve Historical Society's website about the lives of Louis and Carl Stokes
 Collections
Stokes: An American Dream on PBS's World channel
 The National Science Foundation has funded "Louis Stokes Alliances" to support post-secondary education of minority students.

1925 births
2015 deaths
20th-century American politicians
African-American lawyers
African-American members of the United States House of Representatives
African-American United States Army personnel
African-American people in Ohio politics
American Freemasons
American Prince Hall Freemasons
United States Army personnel of World War II
Case Western Reserve University alumni
Cleveland–Marshall College of Law alumni
Deaths from brain cancer in the United States
Deaths from cancer in Ohio
Deaths from lung cancer
Ohio lawyers
Lawyers from Cleveland
United States Army soldiers
Candidates in the 1992 United States presidential election
20th-century American lawyers
Democratic Party members of the United States House of Representatives from Ohio
20th-century African-American politicians
21st-century African-American people
African Americans in World War II
Members of Congress who became lobbyists